Tjongsfjorden Church is a parish church of the Church of Norway in Rødøy Municipality in Nordland county, Norway. It is located in the village of Tjong on the mainland in the northern part of the municipality. It is one of the churches in the Rødøy parish which is part of the Nord-Helgeland prosti (deanery) in the Diocese of Sør-Hålogaland. The white, wooden church was built in a long church style in 1962 using plans drawn up by the architect Per Myrvold. The church seats about 280 people.

See also
List of churches in Sør-Hålogaland

References

Rødøy
Churches in Nordland
Wooden churches in Norway
20th-century Church of Norway church buildings
Churches completed in 1962
1962 establishments in Norway
Long churches in Norway